Xiaoye Sherry Li is a researcher in numerical methods at the Lawrence Berkeley National Laboratory, where she works as a senior scientist. She is responsible there for the SuperLU package, a high-performance parallel system for solving sparse systems of linear equations by using their LU decomposition. At the Lawrence Berkeley National Laboratory, she heads the Scalable Solvers Group.

Education
Li graduated from Tsinghua University in 1986, with a bachelor's degree in computer science. She moved to the United States for graduate study, earning a master's degree from Pennsylvania State University in 1990 and a Ph.D. in computer science from the University of California, Berkeley in 1996. Her doctoral dissertation, Sparse Gaussian Elimination on High Performance Computers, was supervised by James Demmel.

Recognition
In 2016, she was elected as a SIAM Fellow "for advances in the development of fast and scalable sparse matrix algorithms and fostering their use in large-scale scientific and engineering applications". With Piyush Sao and Richard Vuduc she was awarded the 2022 SIAM Activity Group on Supercomputing Best Paper Prize.

References

External links
Home page

Year of birth missing (living people)
Living people
Chinese mathematicians
Chinese computer scientists
20th-century American mathematicians
21st-century American mathematicians
American women mathematicians
American computer scientists
Chinese women computer scientists
Tsinghua University alumni
Pennsylvania State University alumni
University of California, Berkeley alumni
Fellows of the Society for Industrial and Applied Mathematics
20th-century women mathematicians
21st-century women mathematicians
20th-century American women
21st-century American women